Phrynetoides minor is a species of beetle in the family Cerambycidae. It was described by Bernhard Schwarzer in 1931. It is known from the Democratic Republic of the Congo and Uganda.

References

Phrynetini
Beetles described in 1931